The Royal Commission for Riyadh City (RCRC), before 2019 as The Riyadh Development Authority (RDA) and until 2018 as The High Commission for the Development of Arriyadh, is a royal commission established in 1974 during the reign of King Faisal which was tasked with overseeing urban, economic, social and cultural development of Riyadh, the capital of Saudi Arabia.

History 
The Royal Commission for Riyadh City was established during the reign of King Faisal as the High Commission for the Development of Arriyadh through a resolution of the Council of Ministers decree No. 717, dated 20 June, 1974 (29/05/1394H) to realize the will of the Custodian of the Two Holy Mosques to establish a joint authority that leads, supervises and orchestrates the comprehensive development of the city of Riyadh.

Responsibilities 
The Royal Commission for Riyadh will take the responsibilities of Riyadh Development Authority. These responsibilities include setting up the policies for the metropolitan development as well as supervising the strategic programs and plans from the study to the implementation.

Main projects 
There are various projects developed by the commission including:

 King Abdulaziz Project for Riyadh Public Transport.
 Historical Addir'iyah Development Program.
 Wadi Namar and Wadi Laban Environmental Rehabilitation Project.
 King Abdulaziz Historical Center Project.
 Saudi Railway .

References 

2019 establishments in Saudi Arabia
Government agencies of Saudi Arabia